Local TV Teesside (typeset as LOCAL TV Teesside) is a local television station serving Middlesbrough and Teesside and parts of County Durham and North Yorkshire.

The station is owned and operated by Local Television Limited and forms part of a group of eight Local TV stations.

History 
In November 2013, the broadcast regulator OFCOM announced Made Television and Trinity Mirror had been awarded a licence to run a local TV service for the Middlesbrough and Teesside areas. The licence had also been contested by a locally based group known as TeesVision.

Made in Teesside began broadcasting on Freeview and Virgin Media platforms at 6pm on Thursday 30 March 2017. The station is run jointly with its sister Tyne and Wear station from studios at the University of Sunderland with production staff also based locally in Middlesbrough. In November 2017, studio production of daily news and magazine programmes was transferred to other Made TV stations.

On Thursday 25 May 2017, Made in Teesside and its sister channels began carrying acquired programming from the UK & Ireland version of factual entertainment channel TruTV as part of a supply agreement with Sony Pictures Television. The station simulcasts TruTV in two daily blocks from 1-5pm and from 9pm-1am (8pm - midnight on Tuesdays to accommodate America's Got Talent).  As of November 2017, the Made network began simulcasting CBS Reality for eleven hours a day. 

In January 2022, OFCOM approved a request by the channel to close its Middlesbrough offices and move permanently to a remote production model implemented during the COVID-19 pandemic, with content sent electronically to Local TV's broadcast centre in Leeds for playout.

Programming 
Teesside TV is required to broadcast 37 hours a week of first-run programming.

As of February 2018, the station's sole local programmes are North East Live, a rolling four-hour block of pre-recorded local news, sport and features airing each weeknight from 5-9pm as well as RedArmyTV, a 30-minute independently produced football fan TV show about Middlesbrough FC - broadcast at 7.30pm on Friday's RedArmyTV is produced by Teesside-based TV production company XCel Broadcast. A half-hour regional block also airs on the generic Made Television networked feed on digital satellite each weekday evening at 7.30pm.

Programmes produced by the other Local TV Ltd stations also air on the channel along with acquired programming from independent producers and other broadcasters around the UK, including the thrice-daily programming blocks from CBS Reality - airing from 9-11am, 1-5pm and 9pm-2am.

References

External links 

Local television channels in the United Kingdom
Television channels and stations established in 2017
North East England